Lomonosovo is a rural locality (a village) in Chishminsky District, Bashkortostan, Russia. The population was 7 as of 2010. There is 1 street.

Geography 
Lomonosovo is located 34 km southeast of Chishmy (the district's administrative centre) by road. Bilyazy is the nearest rural locality.

References 

Rural localities in Chishminsky District